Altha may refer to:
Altha, Florida, a town in Florida
Altha (moth), a genus of moth
Altha Lake, a lake in California